The 2018–19 Western Kentucky Lady Toppers basketball team represents Western Kentucky University during the 2018–19 NCAA Division I women's basketball season. The Lady Toppers were led by first year head coach Greg Collins. They play their home games at E. A. Diddle Arena and were members of Conference USA. They finished the season 20–15, 11–5 in C-USA play to finish in a tie for third place. They advanced to the semifinals of the C-USA women's tournament where they lost to Rice. They received an at-large bid to the Women's National Invitation Tournament where they defeated Miami (OH) and Morehead State in the first and second rounds before losing to Ohio in the third round.

Roster

Schedule

|-
!colspan=9 style=| Exhibition

|-
!colspan=9 style=| Non-conference regular season

|-
!colspan=9 style=| Conference USA regular season

|-
!colspan=9 style=| Conference USA Women's Tournament

|-
!colspan=9 style=| WNIT

Rankings
2018–19 NCAA Division I women's basketball rankings

See also
2018–19 Western Kentucky Hilltoppers basketball team

References

Western Kentucky Lady Toppers basketball seasons
WKU
WKU
WKU
Western Kentucky